Look to the Skies is the debut album by American heavy metal band, Sicmonic. It was independently released in August 2006  and only 2000 copies of the album were pressed and released. The album’s first single, “Fist to Throat” featured a Fallen Films released music video and was shot behind their rehearsal studio in Phoenix, Arizona. The video was directed and edited by Freddy Allen. Look to the Skies is the first and last release that drummer Douglas Berry performed on.

The album features a cover of the Charlie Daniels Band song, “The Devil Went Down to Georgia”.

Track listing
All songs by Sicmonic, except "Devil Went Down to Georgia" by Charlie Daniels Band.

Personnel
Sicmonic
 Taylor Hession – vocals
 Ray Goodwin – lead guitar, violin
 Robert "Bob" Warren – rhythm guitar
 Jason Williams – bass
 Douglas Berry – drums, percussion

Production
 Sicmonic – producers, mixing
 Byron Filson – producer, recording, mastering, mixing
 Aaron Layman – engineer
 Ray Goodwin – additional lyrics on "Paradisym" and "Requiem"

References

2006 albums
Sicmonic albums